Montini Catholic High School (often shortened to Montini) is a co-educational, college preparatory, high school, run by the Christian Brothers in Lombard, Illinois.  It is located in the Roman Catholic Diocese of Joliet in Illinois.  The school was planned by the Christian Brothers in 1963.  Pope Paul VI, whose name was Giovanni Battista Montini (John Baptist Montini), was elected to the Papacy that same year.  In his honor, the Christian Brothers named the school Montini Catholic High School.  Construction of the buildings took place in 1965 and 1966.  In September 1966, Montini Catholic High school opened its doors to 217 freshmen.  The first commencement exercises were held on June 1, 1970.

Renovations
The campus renovation initiative, begun in the fall of 2002, is called the Capital Campaign.

Phase I of the Capital Campaign, construction of the West Wing, was completed in 2003.  The West Wing contains the 300 Corridor, which added 8 new classrooms to the school and the Field House.

Phase II of the Capital Campaign, demolition of Dominic Hall and construction of an Academic and Administrative Center, was completed in 2009.

Phase III of the Capital Campaign was begun in the summer of 2010 and was slated for completion by 2016.

Academics

The school year is divided into two 18-week semesters.  Mid-semester grades are issued at 9 weeks.  The school day consists of 8 class periods of 48 minutes each.

Athletics
Montini is a member of two conferences for boys Chicago Catholic League for girls they are in GCAC and both boys and girls participate in the Illinois High School Association.  Teams are stylized as the Broncos and Lady Broncos respectively.

The school offers a number of fall, winter, spring and year-round sports for both girls and boys.  Sports offerings include:

Athletic accomplishments

The Broncos football team began its current streak of state playoff appearances in 1993, making it to the semifinals that year. The first football state championship was won during the 2004 season, with a 44–7 victory over Coal City in the Class 4a title game. High finishes and state titles within the IHSA listed below:

Boys baseball

Boys football

Boys track and field

Boys wrestling

Girls basketball

Girls softball

Girls cross country

The school's dance team, The Broncettes, have won two consecutive state Pom titles and over 15 state titles in the IDTA dating back to 1994.

Notable alumni
 Scott Sobkowiak, Former MLB player (Atlanta Braves)
 Chase Beebe, Former bantamweight Champion  World Extreme Cage Fighting
 Jordan Westerkamp, Athlete, Wide Receiver Nebraska Cornhuskers
 Jaleel Johnson, Athlete, Defensive Lineman New Orleans Saints

References

External links

 

Educational institutions established in 1966
Illinois
Roman Catholic Diocese of Joliet in Illinois
Catholic secondary schools in Illinois
Lombard, Illinois
Schools in DuPage County, Illinois
1966 establishments in Illinois